Graham Street Prims Football Club is a football club based in Derby, England.

History
The club was established in 1904 by members of Primitive Methodist church in Graham Street. They initially played in the Derby Sunday Schools' League, but folded in 1914. They reformed in 1953 and played in the  Derby & District Senior League. In 1968 the club joined the Premier Division of the Central Alliance, with the reserves playing in Division One. They went on to win the Premier Division in 1970–71, after which they joined Division One of the East Midlands Regional League. They subsequently won the Division One title in 1971–72, earning promotion to the Premier Division.

Graham Street Prims were East Midlands Regional League champions in 1978–79. In 1981 they were elected into Division One of the Midland League. However, at the end of the 1981–82 season the league merged with the Yorkshire League to form the Northern Counties East League, with the club placed in Division Two South. League reorganisation saw them placed in Division One South in 1984, and then Division Three in 1985. However, Division Three was disbanded at the end of the 1985–86 season and the club dropped into the Premier Division of the Central Midlands League.

In 1987 the club was renamed Derby Prims. They were Premier Division runners-up in 1987–88, but folded in 1991 due to their ground not meeting the league requirements. After being reformed again in 1995 and absorbing the Derby Carriage & Wagon club, the club rejoined the Premier Division of the Central Midlands League. A third-place finish in their first season saw them promoted to the Supreme Division. Although they were relegated back to the Premier Division at the end of the 1998–99 season, the club were Premier Division runners-up the following season, earning promotion back to the Supreme Division. In 2008 the club were founder members of the East Midlands Counties League. In 2013–14 they won the League Cup, beating Sutton Town 4–2 in the final. The club remained members of the East Midlands Counties League until it was disbanded at the end of the 2020–21 season, at which point they were transferred to Division One of the United Counties League. After one season in the United Counties League, they were due to be transferred again, this time to Division One of the Midland League, but chose relegation to the Central Midlands Football League

Ground
After reforming in 1995, the club played at the Railway Ground in Longbridge Lane. However, the ground did not have floodlights and was frequently vandalised. As a result, the club built a new ground on Borrowash Road adjacent to Borrowash Victoria's ground.

Honours
East Midlands Counties League
League Cup winners 2013–14
East Midlands Regional League
Champions 1978–79
Division One champions 1971–72
Central Alliance
Premier Division champions 1970–71

Records
Best FA Cup performance: Extra-preliminary round, 2013–14, 2014–15
Best FA Vase performance: Third round, 2013–14

See also
Graham Street Prims F.C. players
Graham Street Prims F.C. managers

References

External links

 
Football clubs in England
Football clubs in Derbyshire
1904 establishments in England
Association football clubs established in 1904
Sport in Derby
Central Alliance
East Midlands Regional League
Midland Football League (1889)
Northern Counties East Football League
Central Midlands Football League
East Midlands Counties Football League
United Counties League
Midland Football League